"Where Are You" is a song written by Maurice Gibb. It marked his debut as a lead vocalist and solo composer. It was included on the Bee Gees' 1966 album Spicks and Specks. In 1968, it was released in the US.

Origin
It was written by Maurice Gibb in 1966 and was his first to appear on any Bee Gees albums. It was recorded around April and May 1966.

Another Maurice composition from that year, "All by Myself" was released in 1970 on Inception/Nostalgia.

The song had drawn Kipner's attention to Maurice's potential as a more than competent songwriter, Maurice generally felt more comfortable writing the music than the words.

Personnel
Maurice Gibb — lead vocals, acoustic guitar, bass guitar
Barry Gibb — acoustic guitar, backing vocals
Robin Gibb — backing vocals
Colin Petersen — drums
John Robinson — bass guitar

Releases

Mike Furber version

The Mike Furber version of "Where Are You" credits Barry Gibb as the songwriter (instead of the original songwriter Maurice Gibb). Furber's version was released in December 1966 by Kommotion Records only in Australia and was released on the EP of the same name. The backing band was Max Merritt and the Meteors, with the Gibb brothers singing backup vocals. Furber's version reached No. 93 in the Australia Kent Music Report charts.

References

Bee Gees songs
1966 songs
Songs written by Maurice Gibb
1966 singles